"Ring the Alarm" is a 2006 song by Beyoncé.

Ring the Alarm may also refer to:

 Ring the Alarm (album), a 2004 album by Philly's Most Wanted 
 "Ring the Alarm" (Fu-Schnickens song), a 1991 song by Fu-Schnickens
 "Ring the Alarm", a 2022 song by KARD from Re:
 "Ring the Alarm", a 1985 song by Tenor Saw
 "Ring the Alarm", a 1993 song by Buju Banton featuring Tenor Saw
 "Ring the Alarm", a 2006 song by Keshia Chante from 2U
 "Ring the Alarm", a 2018 song by The Black Eyed Peas